Score (stylized as SCORE) is a Pakistani sports talk show hosted by Yahya Hussaini that is broadcast on Geo TV. It is written by Khursheed Alam and directed by Farrukh Suleman. The show debuted in February 2011.

Segments

Baarwhan Khiladi 
On selection committees and their decisions, who drop players on personal biases, commenting upon their criterion and looking for reasons and justifications.

Oopper Neechay 
Showing top ten international players' lists in various popular genres of sports.

Cricket Plus 
Cricket Plus is about up-to-the-minute news, scores, and schedules, knockout sixes and fours, historical catches, and memorable match winning performances.

References

External links 
 

Geo News
Urdu-language television shows